is a national highway connecting Kaita, Hiroshima and Kure in Japan.

Route data
Length: 20.1 km (12.5 mi)
Origin: Kaita, Hiroshima (originates at junction with Route 2) 
Terminus: Kure (ends at the origin of Route 185)
Major cities: Aki-ku, Hiroshima, Saka

History
1952-12-04 - First Class National Highway 31 (from Kaita, Hiroshima to Kure)
1965-04-01 - General National Highway 31 (from Kaita, Hiroshima to Kure)

Intersects with

Hiroshima Prefecture

References

031
Roads in Hiroshima Prefecture